East Tsim Sha Tsui is a station of the Mass Transit Railway (MTR) system of Hong Kong.

The station was built to alleviate surface traffic jams and passenger congestion at Kowloon Tong station.

History
The predecessor of the East Rail line was the Kowloon–Canton Railway (British Section), which was opened in 1910. At the time of opening, its southern terminus was the  located in Tsim Sha Tsui, where the Clock Tower stands today. However, the old Kowloon station was closed in 1975, and the southern terminus of the railway was relocated to the newly built Hung Hom station.

Plans for East Tsim Sha Tsui were subsequently revived in 1993 when the plans for East Kowloon line were modified to become a medium-capacity system as part of an Eastern Corridor with transfer to the Lantau Airport Railway (now  and ). The contract to construct East Tsim Sha Tsui was subsequently awarded to a consortium consisting of Hong Kong-based Gammon Construction and Japan-based Nishimatsu.

It served as the southern terminus of the East Rail line until 16 August 2009. As a result of its underground location, the station was equipped with full-height platform screen doors, of the same type used on the KCR West Rail, which opened the year prior. The station was the only one on the East Rail line with these doors for five years, and as a result, the 12-car-long set of screen doors were the longest in the world.

The status of the East Tsim Sha Tsui station as the southern terminus of the East Rail line was intended to be a temporary arrangement only. As a result, Hung Hom became the common southern terminus of (and provided cross-platform interchange between) the East Rail line and the West Rail line, whilst East Tsim Sha Tsui became an intermediate station on the West Rail line. Due to the shorter length of the Tuen Ma line trains (8 cars), the ends of the platforms were taken out of use and closed off.

Hence, East Tsim Sha Tsui was included in the project and is now an intermediate station on the Tuen Ma line.

Station layout

Passengers heading towards the Tsuen Wan line ride the escalator up to the concourse and leave the Tuen Ma line system. Then they walk along the Middle Road or Mody Road subway system respectively to reach Tsim Sha Tsui station at exits L2 and M3, respectively.

Although the stations are connected by subway, the fare gates for East Tsim Sha Tsui and Tsim Sha Tsui stations are separated. Single journey ticket passengers transferring from the Tuen Ma line to the Tsuen Wan line must purchase a second ticket at Tsim Sha Tsui station as the ticket is withdrawn once the passengers exit through the turnstiles at East Tsim Sha Tsui station. In contrast, Octopus card users who transfer between East Tsim Sha Tsui and Tsim Sha Tsui stations within thirty minutes without making any other transport related purchases or more than nine non-transport related purchases in between stations are considered to have taken a single journey and are charged accordingly. Also, MTR City Saver users who transfer between East Tsim Sha Tsui and Tsim Sha Tsui stations within thirty minutes are considered to have taken a single journey and are charged accordingly.

Entrances/exits
East Tsim Sha Tsui station is linked with Tsim Sha Tsui station through the Mody Road and Middle Road subways. When both stations' exits are combined, the total number of exits outnumber even that of Central. Tsim Sha Tsui station has the exit with the highest letter of all rail stations in Hong Kong.

There's no exits I or O because of the confusion with 1 and 0 respectively.

In Tsim Sha Tsui station
 A1: Kowloon Park 
 A2: Humphreys Avenue
 B1: Nathan Road
 B2: Cameron Road
 C1: Nathan Road
 C2: Peking Road
 D1: Nathan Road
 D2: Carnarvon Road
 E: Kowloon Hotel
 H: iSQUARE
 R: iSQUARE

In East Tsim Sha Tsui station
 J: Victoria Dockside 
 K: Middle Road 
 L1: Hermes House
 L3: Peninsula Hotel 
 L4: Kowloon Hotel
 L5: Peking Road 
 L6: Salisbury Road 
 N1: Mody Road 
 N2: Hanoi Road
 N3: K11 Art Mall
 N4: K11 Art Mall
 N5: Nathan Road
 P1: Wing On Plaza 
 P2: Tsim Sha Tsui East 
 P3: Chatham Road South

References

External links
 Station map

MTR stations in Kowloon
West Rail line
Tuen Ma line
Tsim Sha Tsui East
Tsim Sha Tsui
Former Kowloon–Canton Railway stations
Railway stations in Hong Kong opened in 2004
2004 establishments in Hong Kong